Stob may refer to:

People
 Verity Stob (since 1988), pseudonymous author of IT satirical articles
 Ralph Stob (1894–1965), U.S. academic, president (1933–1939) of Calvin College
 Henry J. Stob (1908–1996), U.S. academic, namesake of the Calvinist Stob Lectures

Places
 Stob (village), part of Bulgaria's municipality of Kocherinovo
 Stob Earth Pyramids, in Bulgaria's Kyustendil Province
 Stob, Scottish prefix for "Mount", as in Stob Binnein, Stob Coire Sgreamhach, Stob Ghabhar, etc.
 Stobs Military Camp just outside Hawick Scotland